Pope Paschal II (r. 1099–1118) created 92 cardinals in fifteen consistories held throughout his pontificate. This included the future Antipope Anacletus II.

1099
 Crisogono
 Giovanni O.S.B.
 Amico O.S.B. Cas.
 Gregorio Gaetani
 Guido O.S.B.
 Ugo
 Pandolfo O.S.B. Cas.
 Ulrich
 Antonio
 Bd. Berardo dei Marsi
 Romano Bobone
 Gualon O.S.B. Clun.
 Gregorio O.S.B.
 Docibilo

1100
 Pietro
 Agostino
 Romano
 Teobaldo
 Pietro Modoliense
 Pietro O.S.B. Cas.
 Giovanni
 Gualterio

1101
 Riccardo O.S.B.

1102
 Crescenzio seniore
 Domnizzone
 Teobaldo

1104
 Gualon
 Ubaldo

1105
 Corrado
 Leone O.S.B. Cas.
 Bonifacio
 Desiderio
 Domnizzone
 Guy
 Giovanni
 Vitale
 Ascanio
 Ugo d'Alatri
 Bosone

1106
 Cinzio
 Vincenzo
 Gezo
 Errico
 Pietro Pierleoni O.S.B. Clun. (future Antipope Anacletus II)

1107
 Giovanni
 Gregorio
 Leone

1108
 Kuno von Urach Can. Reg.

1112
 Manfredo
 Ugo Visconti
 Uberto
 Gregorio
 Pietro Gherardesca
 Anastasio
 Niccolò
 Pietro
 Roscemanno, O.S.B. Cas.
 Oderisio O.S.B. Cas.
 Romualdo Guarna
 Crescenzio

1113
 Adeodato
 Corrado
 Gionata
 Teodoro
 Gregorio

1114
 Anatasio
 Bonifacio
 Giovanni O.S.B. Cas.
 Teobaldo
 Corrado Dimitri Della Subburra

1115
 Leone
 Vitale
 Divizzo
 Gerardo
 Leone O.S.B.
 Giovanni

1116
 Crescenzio iuniore
 Pietro seniore
 Bosone
 Pietro

1117
 Lamberto
 Sasso
 Giovanni da Crema
 Rainerio
 Bosone
 Crisogono
 Sigizzone
 Teobaldo
 Pietro
 Amico O.S.B. Cas. iuniore
 Crisogono Malcondini
 Errico O.S.B.

Notes and references

Sources

College of Cardinals
Paschal II
Pas
Pope Paschal II